Fort Ross (Russian: Форт-Росс, Kashaya mé·ṭiʔni), originally Fortress Ross (pre-reformed Russian: Крѣпость Россъ, tr. Krepostʹ Ross), is a former Russian establishment on the west coast of North America in what is now Sonoma County, California. It was the hub of the southernmost Russian settlements in North America from 1812 to 1841. Notably, it was the first multi-ethnic community in northern California, with a combination of Native Californians, Native Alaskans, and Russians. It has been the subject of archaeological investigation and is a California Historical Landmark, a National Historic Landmark, and on the National Register of Historic Places. It is part of California's Fort Ross State Historic Park.

Etymology

The present name of Fort Ross appears first on a French chart published in 1842 by Eugène Duflot de Mofras, who visited California in 1840. The name of the fort is said to derive from the Russian word rus or ros, the same root as the word "Russia" (Rossiya) and not from Scottish "Ross". According to William Bright, "Ross" is a poetic name for a Russian in the Russian language.

History
Beginning with Columbus in 1492, the Spanish presence in the Western Hemisphere (like most other European exploration and colonization) traveled west across the Atlantic Ocean, then around or across the Americas to reach the Pacific Ocean. The Russian expansion, however, moved east across Siberia and the northern Pacific. In the early nineteenth century, Spanish and Russian expansion met along the coast of Spanish Alta California, with Russia pushing south and Spain pushing north. By that time, British and American fur trade companies had also established a coastal presence, in the Pacific Northwest, and Mexico was soon to gain independence. Mexico ceded Alta California to the United States of America following the Mexican–American War (1848). The history of the Russian Fort Ross settlement began during Spanish rule and ended under Mexican rule.

Earliest people 
The earliest people known to have lived at the site were there during the Upper Archaic period (1000 B.C. - A.D. 500) and the Lower Emergent period (A.D. 1000 - 1500), but the main occupation began at A.D. 1500 and continued through 1812. Archaeological and ethnographic evidence suggest that the Native Californians lived in large and mostly permanent villages. In summer months, they had "special purpose camps" they would go to in order to get certain resources. This area was one of such camps, used for its access to tidal and marine resources.

Ethnographic evidence suggests that the area where Fort Ross would be located was a large part of Kashaya Pomo territory. Their name for the site was "Metini". Their exact arrival date is unknown, but according to linguistic and archaeological data, they moved to Metini sometime between 1,000 and 500 B.C. Archaeological data shows that the Kashaya Pomo increased their subsistence activities upon arrival at this site and gained greater diversity in their tool kits.

Russian-American Company

Russian personnel from the Alaskan colonies initially arrived in California aboard American ships. In 1803, American ship captains already involved in the sea otter maritime fur trade in California proposed several joint venture hunting expeditions to Alexander Andreyevich Baranov, on half shares using Russian supervisors and native Alaskan hunters to hunt fur seals and otters along the Alta and Baja Californian coast. Subsequent reports by the Russian hunting parties of uncolonized stretches of coast encouraged Baranov, the Chief Administrator of the Russian-American Company (RAC), to consider a settlement in California north of the limit of Spanish occupation in San Francisco. In 1806 the Russian Ambassador to Japan, and RAC director Nikolay Rezanov, undertook an exploratory trade mission to California to establish a formal means of procuring food supplies in exchange for Russian goods in San Francisco. While guests of the Spanish, Rezanov's captain, Lt. Khvostov, explored and charted the coast north of San Francisco Bay and found it completely unoccupied by other European powers. Upon his return to Novoarkhangelsk (New Archangel), Rezanov recommended to Baranov, and the Emperor Alexander, that a settlement be established in California.

Fort Ross was established by Commerce Counselor Ivan Kuskov of the Russian-American Company. In 1808 Baranov sent two ships, the Kad'yak and the Sv. Nikolai, on an expedition south to establish settlements for the RAC with instructions to bury "secret signs" (possession plaques). Kuskov, on the Kad'yak, was instructed to bury the plaques, with an appropriate possession ceremony, at Trinidad, Bodega Bay, and on the shore north of San Francisco, indicating Russian claims to the land. After sailing into Bodega Bay in 1809 on the Kad'yak and returning to Novoarkhangelsk with beaver skins and 1,160 otter pelts, Baranov ordered Kuskov to return and establish an agricultural settlement in the area. After a failed attempt in 1811, Kuskov sailed the brig Chirikov back to Bodega Bay in March 1812, naming it the Gulf of Rumyantsev or Rumyantsev Bay (Zaliv Rumyantseva) in honor of the Russian Minister of Commerce Count Nikolai Petrovich Rumyantzev. He also named the Russian River the Slavic River (Slavyanka). On his return, Kuskov found American otter hunting ships and otter now scarce in Bodega Bay. Metini, the seasonal home of the Kashaya Pomo, had a modest anchorage and abundant natural resources and would become the Russian settlement of Fortress Ross.

Fort Ross was established as an agricultural base from which the northern settlements could be supplied with food, while also continuing trade with Alta California. Yet during its initial ten years of operations the post "provided the company with nothing but heavy expenses for its maintenance." Fort Ross itself was the hub of a number of smaller Russian settlements comprising what was called  "Fortress Ross" on official documents and charts produced by the Company itself. Colony Ross referred to the entire area where Russians had settled. These settlements constituted the southernmost Russian colony in North America and were spread over an area stretching from Point Arena to Tomales Bay. The colony included a port at Bodega Bay called Port Rumyantsev, a sealing station on the Farallon Islands  out to sea from San Francisco, and by 1830 three small farming communities called "ranchos": Chernykh (Rancho Egora Chernykh) near present-day Graton, Khlebnikov (Rancho Vasiliya Khlebnikova) a mile north of the present day town of Bodega in the Salmon Creek valley, and Kostromitinov (Rancho Petra Kostromitinova) on the Russian River.

Local enterprise
In addition to farming and manufacturing, the Company carried on its fur-trading business at Fort Ross, but by 1817, after 20 years of intense hunting by Spanish, American and British ships—followed by Russian efforts—sea otters had been practically eliminated from the area.

Fort Ross was the site of California's first windmills and shipbuilding. Russian scientists associated with the colony were among the first to record California's cultural and natural history. The Russian managers introduced many European innovations such as glass windows, stoves, and all-wood housing into Alta California. Together with the surrounding settlement, Fort Ross was home to Russian subjects (which during the 19th and early 20th century included Russians, Ukrainians, Poles, Belarusians, Finns, Baltic Germans, Estonians, Lithuanians, Latvians, Georgians, Circassians, Tatars, and numerous other nationalities and ethnic groups of the Russian Empire), as well as North Pacific Natives, Aleuts, Kashaya (Pomo), and Alaskan Creoles. The native populations of the Sonoma and Napa County regions were affected by smallpox, measles and other infectious diseases that were common across Asia, Europe, and Africa.  One instance can be traced to the settlement of Fort Ross. However, the first vaccination in California history was carried out by the crew of the Kutuzov, a Russian-American Company vessel arriving from Callao, Peru which brought vaccine to Monterey in August, 1821. The Kutuzov's surgeon vaccinated 54 persons. Another instance of disease prevention was when a visiting Hudson's Bay Company hunting party was refused entry to the Colony in 1833, when it was feared that a malaria epidemic which had devastated the Central Valley was carried by its members. In 1837 a very deadly epidemic of smallpox that came from this settlement via New Archangel wiped out most native people in the Sonoma and Napa County regions.

Mexican response 

Between 1824 and 1836 the Mexicans found during every exploratory effort north of present-day San Rafael and west of Sonoma increasing evidence of Russian presence. They discovered at least three Russian farms that had been established inland from Fort Ross. Governor José Figueroa wanted to counter the Russians' gradual encroachment in Northern California. In 1834, he granted Rancho Petaluma to Mariano Guadalupe Vallejo. In 1835 he appointed Vallejo as Comandante of the Fourth Military District and Director of Colonization of the Northern Frontier, the highest military command in Northern California, and encouraged him to build the Presidio of Sonoma. To extend the settlements in the direction of Fort Ross, Vallejo granted his brother-in-law, Captain John B. R. Cooper, who had married his sister Encarnacion, Rancho El Molino (about ). The grant was confirmed by Governor Nicolás Gutiérrez in 1836.

Upon his arrival in Alta California in 1839, John Sutter was attracted to the land near the Sacramento River. To obtain the land and permission to settle in the territory, he went to the capital at Monterey and requested a grant from Governor Juan Bautista Alvarado. Alvarado saw Sutter's plan of establishing a colony in the Central Valley as useful in "buttressing the frontier which he was trying to maintain against Indians, Russians, Americans and British." Sutter persuaded Governor Alvarado to grant him  of land for the sake of curtailing American encroachment on the Mexican territory of California. Sutter was given the right to "represent in the Establishment of New Helvetia all the laws of the country, to function as political authority and dispenser of justice, in order to prevent the robberies committed by adventurers from the United States, to stop the invasion of savage Indians, and the hunting and trading by companies from the Columbia (river)." He named the settlement New Helvetia. In an 1841 inventory for John Sutter describes the settlement surrounding the fort: "twenty-four planked dwellings with glazed windows, a floor and a ceiling; each had a garden. There were eight sheds, eight bathhouses and ten kitchens."

Decline of Fort Ross 

By 1841 the settlement's agricultural importance had decreased considerably, the local population of fur-bearing marine mammals had been long depleted by international over-hunting, and the recently secularized California missions no longer supplemented the agricultural needs of the Alaskan colonies. Following the formal trade agreement in 1838 between the Russian-American Company in New Archangel and Hudson's Bay Company at Fort Vancouver and Fort Langley for their agricultural needs, the settlement at Fort Ross was no longer needed to supply the Alaskan colonies with food. The Russian-American Company consequently offered the settlement to various potential purchasers, and it was sold to John Sutter, a Mexican citizen of Swiss origin, soon to be renowned for the discovery of gold at his lumber mill in the Sacramento valley. Although the settlement was sold for $30,000 to Sutter, some Russian historians assert the sum was never paid; therefore legal title of the settlement was never transferred to Sutter and the area still belongs to the Russian people. A recent Sutter biography however, asserts that Sutter's agent, Peter Burnett, paid the Russian-American Company agent William M. Steuart $19,788 in "notes and gold" on April 13, 1849, thereby settling the outstanding debt for Fort Ross and Bodega.

20th century
Possession of Fort Ross passed from Sutter through successive private hands and finally to George W. Call. Three years later it was turned over to the State of California for preservation and restoration as a state historic monument. Since then, the state has acquired more of the surrounding land for preservation purposes. California Department of Parks and Recreation as well as many volunteers put extensive efforts into restoration and reconstruction work in the Fort.

 

State Route 1 once bisected Fort Ross. It entered from the northeast where the Kuskov House once stood, and exited through the main gate to the southwest. The road was eventually diverted, and the parts of the fort that had been demolished for the road were rebuilt. The old roadway can still be seen going from the main gate to the northwest; the rest (within the fort and extending northeast) has been removed.

Most of the existing buildings on the site are reconstructions. Cooperative research efforts with Russian archives will help to correct interpretive errors present in structures that date from the Cold-War period. The only original structure remaining is the Rotchev House. Known as the "Commandant's House" from the 1940s through the 1970s, it was the residence of the last manager, Aleksandr Rotchev. Renovated in 1836 from an existing structure, it was titled the "new commandant's house" in the 1841 inventory to differentiate it from the "old commandant's house" (Kuskov House). The Rotchev House, or in original documents, "Administrator's House", is at the center of efforts to "re-interpret" Russia's part in California's colonial history. The Fort Ross Interpretive Association has received several federally funded grants to restore both exterior and interior elements. While its exterior has been partially restored, its interior is currently undergoing restoration to reflect the recent research that shows a more cosmopolitan and refined aspect of colonial life at the Fort.

The Fort Ross Chapel collapsed in the 1906 San Francisco earthquake but much of the original structural woodwork remained and it was re-erected in 1916, but retained the appearance of the American ranch-period modifications when it was used as a stable. Several other restorations ensued, but none incorporated the information in Voznesensky's 1841 water-colour which portray the chapel with copper-clad cupola and tower, and red-metal roof. "The Fort Ross Chapel was found eligible for designation as a National Historic Landmark in 1969, architecturally significant as a rare U.S. example of a log church constructed on a Russian quadrilateral plan. An accidental fire destroyed the chapel on October 5, 1970. This loss of the original workmanship and materials of the chapel led to withdrawal of the Chapel's Landmark designation in 1971. A complete reconstruction of the chapel was undertaken in 1973 and the Fort Ross settlement, as a whole, retains its National Historic Landmark designation." The current chapel was built during the intensive restoration activity that followed, but retains the American ranch period appearance.

A large orchard, including several original trees planted by the Russians, is located inland on Fort Ross Road in Sonoma County.

Fort Ross is now a part of Fort Ross State Historic Park, open to the public.In addition to fishing, hiking, surfing, exploring tide pools, picnicking, whale watching, and bird watching, the Park has become a popular destination for scuba divers, some of whom visit Fort Ross Reef. The wreckage of the SS Pomona lies just offshore Fort Ross State Park.

Fort Ross Cemetery
In 1990–1992 the Fort Ross Cemetery, located on a ridge adjacent to the settlement, was cleared and 135 gravesites were identified by archaeological excavations. The project was undertaken in collaboration with the Russian Orthodox Church (ROC), the Kodiak Area Native Association, the Kashaya Pomo, the Bodega Miwok, and the California Native American Heritage Commission. The graves were mostly contained in the main cemetery, located across the fort and in view of the chapel; however, two grave sites were found outside of this area. Russian Orthodox tradition states that the deceased must be buried in view of a chapel, so it was unexpected to find people buried out of view of it. It is not known why these people were buried outside the main cemetery, but it is possibly because they were buried before the arrival of the Russian Orthodox community and their religious beliefs.

The cemetery served as a burial ground for both Russians and native people, showing no differentiation of rank or status. Out of the 135 graves excavated, 131 had human remains, and four were empty. The empty graves may have been due to poor preservation of human remains or possibly, the earlier removal of the human remains to a different grave site. Based on the grave dimensions, it is estimated that half of the burials were children, who represented 47% of the population of Fort Ross by 1838. Studies show that disease was a common reason for death, as well as various accidents and drownings.

Bodies were generally buried in redwood coffins, or at the very least, a cloth shroud. In 56% of graves, crosses or religious medallions were found. Other items that have been found in the graves have included buttons, glass beads, earrings, dishes, and cloth. Unfortunately, the bones were not preserved very well due to the soil having a high level of acidity. Furthermore, redwood tends to be acidic, so this contributed to the lower levels of bone preservation.

In consultation with Reverend Vladimir Derugin of the ROC, researchers were able to confirm that the burial practices followed traditional Russian Orthodox canon and norms, despite having been conducted in a remote frontier outpost. At the conclusion of the project, all unearthed individuals were returned to their grave sites, and a religious reburial ceremony was conducted.

Conflicting views on the excavation 
When archaeologists began excavating the cemetery, there were many stakeholders they had to consider. Fort Ross is owned by the state of California and is operated by the department of parks and recreation, so they had to give permission in order for the excavation to occur. Also, the Fort Ross Interpretive Association (FRIA), who work with the park to communicate the history to the public were a part of it. Since Native American remains were involved, archaeologists had to get permissions from the nearest descendants they could find; in this case, it was the Kashaya Pomo. Another group that had a part in the excavation was the Kodiak Area Native Association (KANA), because remains of Alaskan natives were buried in the cemetery. The Russian Orthodox Church was also involved because the fort was a Russian outpost; however, there were two separate groups within the church that both laid claim to the cemetery, so archaeologists consulted with them both as to avoid friction.

With all of these different groups involved, there were a few conflicting views on what to do with the remains and how to treat them. For instance, the Russians thought that everyone buried in the cemetery, including the Kashaya and Alaskan natives, were a part of the Orthodox religion, meaning they had converted. However, many of the Kashaya did not agree with this; they had oral accounts saying that the Kashaya had moved bodies from the Russian cemetery to be buried in a more traditional manner. (Kashaya traditional burial requires that the bodies be cremated.) While some elders were curious about the excavation, to see if the archaeological evidence supported their accounts of Kashaya being removed, the majority did not want their burials excavated. Archaeologists agreed, and said they would do their best to not excavate any Kashaya graves—and if they did, they would rebury them. Later analysis would show that none of the exhumed graves were Kashaya. In contrast, the Russians supported the excavations, but wanted all of the remains reburied in the graves from which they came.

Windmills at Fort Ross

Much archaeological research has been done at Fort Ross, more recently in search of the windmills. The historical record states there were at least three windmills, possibly four, although the fourth may have been a watermill or a man- or animal-powered mill. The windmills have gained much attention because various accounts of their exact locations are sometimes inconsistent and vague.  There was, in fact, one windmill located not far from the northern end of the blockade, which was most likely used to grind wheat and barley flour.  Based on the descriptions given by people who visited Fort Ross, it has been concluded that the main windmill, located outside the blockade, was the traditional style Russian .  The root word "stolb" means thick vertical pole.

At the time, the only mills in California, which was under Spanish/Mexican rule, were either water or animal powered.  What made the Russian mills significant is that they were the first windmills in California.  The Russian  needed a very large center post which was sunk into the ground and supported the transverse pole.  The transverse pole was rotated by the wings of the mill that faced the wind current.  Archaeologists are searching for the remains of this center post, which would have left a significant indentation in the ground.

In October 2012 a modern interpretation of one of Fort Ross' windmills was erected and placed near the parking lot and visitors center of the State Historic Park. The windmill was built completely by hand, using the same methods that were presumed to have been used in the days of the Russian American settlement. Its pieces were constructed in Russia and shipped to California, where it was fully assembled and now stands as the only working Russian windmill of this style. It has been pointed out, however, that this is a replica of a 19th or early 20th century Vologda Province windmill, and only bears a slight resemblance to the windmill recorded at Fort Ross in 1841 by Ilya Voznesensky. In Voznesensky's painting the roof is hipped rather than peaked, and there is no roofed exterior porch on the upper left-hand side. The supporting cribbing is covered in the 1841 rendition, and the proportions are noticeably different. The placement near the parking lot at Fort Ross also conflicts with archeologists' views of the actual site of the windmill as portrayed by Voznesensky.

Colonial administrators
Fort Ross colony had five administrators:
Ivan A. Kuskov, 1812–1821
Karl J. von Schmidt, 1821–1824
Pavel I. Shelikhov, 1824–1830
Petr S. Kostromitinov, 1830–1838
, 1838–1841

Derived place names
Along with its status as a National Historic Landmark, the fort itself and the surrounding area are part of Fort Ross State Historic Park.  Fort Ross also designates the small rural community that exists between the towns of Cazadero, Jenner, and Gualala, with the Fort Ross Elementary School at its center.

Milestones

16th and 17th centuries
 1542–1543: Juan Rodríguez Cabrillo visits San Diego, Farallon Islands, Cape Mendocino, Cape Blanco.
 1579–1639: Russian frontiersmen penetrate eastward to Siberia and the Pacific.
 1602: Sebastián Vizcaíno explores to the Columbia River region, naming the Farallon Islands, Point Reyes and the Rio Sebastian (present-day Russian River).

18th century
 1728: Vitus Bering and Alexei Chirikov explore Bering Strait.
 1741–1742: Bering and Chirikov claim Russian America (Alaska) for Russia.
 1769: Gaspar de Portola traveling overland discovers San Francisco Bay.
 1775: Juan Francisco de la Bodega y Quadra anchors in outer Bodega Bay, trades with the local Indians.
 1784: Russians Grigoriy Shelikhov and his wife Nataliya establish a base on Kodiak Island.
 1799: Russian American Company (with manager Aleksandr Baranov) establishes Novo Arkhangelsk (New Archangel, now Sitka, Alaska).

19th century
 1806: Nikolai Rezanov, Imperial Ambassador to Japan and director of the Russian American Company, visits the Presidio of San Francisco.
 1806–1813: American ships bring Russians and Alaska Natives on 12 California fur hunts.
 1808–1811: Ivan Kuskov lands in Bodega Bay (Port Rumiantsev), builds structures and hunts in the region.
 1812, March 15: Ivan Kuskov with 25 Russians and 80 Native Alaskans arrives at Port Rumiantsev and proceeds north to establish Fortress Ross.
 1812, September 11: The Fortress is dedicated on the name-day of Emperor Aleksandr I
 1816: Russian exploring expedition led by Captain Otto von Kotzebue visits California with naturalists Adelbert von Chamisso, Johann Friedrich von Eschscholtz, and artist Louis Choris.
 1817: Russian Chief Administrator Captain Leonty Gagemeister concludes treaty with local tribal chiefs for possession of property near Fortress Ross. First such treaty concluded with native peoples in California.
 1818: The Rumiantsev, first of four ships built at Fortress Ross. The Buldakov, Volga and Kiakhta follow, as well as several longboats.
 1821: Russian Imperial decree gives Native Alaskans and Creoles civil rights protected by law
 1836: Fr. Veniaminov (St. Innocent) visits Fort Ross, conducts services, and carries out census.
 1841: Rotchev sells Fort Ross and accompanying land to John Sutter.

20th and 21st centuries
 1903: California Landmarks League purchases the  fort property from George W. Call for $3000.
 1906: The fort is deeded to what becomes the California State Parks Commission.
 1906, April 18: California's major historical earthquake causes considerable damage to the buildings of the fort compound.
 1916: Fort Ross is partially restored.
 1970: Fires at Fort Ross destroy the chapel and damage the roof of the Rotchev House.
 1971: Fort Ross is once again only partially restored.
 1974: Restored Fort Ross officially reopened.
 2010: The Rotchev House is opened as a house museum
 2010: Memorandum of Agreement signed in San Francisco between the State of California and Renova Group, a Russian entrepreneurial company, whereby the Russian company undertakes to fund the continuing upkeep and operation of Fort Ross.
 2012, March 15: Bodega Bay (Port Rumiantsev) celebrates its 200th anniversary as the main port of Russian California.
 2012, April: The Russian River at Jenner celebrates its 200th anniversary of being named Slavyanka by Ivan Kuskov
 2012, August: an American delegation visits Tot'ma, Russia on its 875th anniversary and 200th anniversary of Fort Ross' founding by Ivan Kuskov, a Tot'ma native.
 2012: Fort Ross State Historic Park celebrated is 200 year bicentennial of the Russian settlement in a historic two-day event that was attended by over 6,500 people. 
 2012, September: The Kashaya expedition to Russia. An unofficial delegation from California was hosted in Russia marking the Kashaya's first ever trip to Russia.
 2012, October: A working interpretation of the original windmill was built and dedicated at the park.

Annual international conference on Russian–U.S. relations
Starting from 2012, Fort Ross Conservancy has been hosting the Fort Ross Dialogue annual international conference on US–Russian Relations and Fort Ross Festival, co-sponsored by Transneft, Chevron and Sovcomflot. The first Russia-based meeting within the framework of the Dialogue was held in Pskov (Russian Federation) on 29 and 30 May 2017. The first day of the Forum was marked by the panel discussion "Towards each other: Russian trailblazers and American pioneers: similarities and dissimilarities of Russian and US experience in arranging museum operations, financing structure, role of the state and private business in promoting cultural sites". On the second day, the forum participants representing business circles and the expert community of Russia and the U.S. reviewed the interaction potential between the two nations in energy industry at the panel discussion "The energy sector as an important element Russian and USA geopolitics".

Buildings

California State Landmark
 On June 1, 1932, Fort Ross was designated "California Historical Landmark #5".

Fort Ross State Historic Park 
The 3,000 acre site was purchased in 1906 by the State of California, to preserve the archaeological remains of the area. Later, more land was purchased and the park now includes some of the surrounding lands which although not originally part of the compound, still hold valuable archaeological evidence.

Fort Ross is located on the coast, meaning it is vulnerable to erosion and other natural processes, such as acidic soil, wildfires, and even the destruction of animals like gophers. The other possible disturbance comes from cultural processes; that is, humans and their actions. Harmful activities include illegal collecting and, more generally, the wear and tear that occurs simply from people visiting the site.

Climate

The National Weather Service has maintained a cooperative weather station at Fort Ross for many years.  Based on those observations, Fort Ross has cool, damp weather most of the year.  Fog and low overcast is common throughout the year.  There are occasional warm days in the summer, which also tend to be relatively dry except for drizzle from heavy fogs or passing showers. According to the Köppen climate classification system, Fort Ross has a warm-summer Mediterranean climate (Csb).

There are an average of only 0.2 days with highs of 90 °F (32 °C) or higher and 5.8 days with lows of 32 °F (0 °C) or lower.

Popular culture

Fort Ross serves as the backdrop in the short story "Facts Relating to the Arrest of Dr. Kalugin," part of Kage Baker's series of science fiction stories concerning "The Company".

Fort Ross is featured in a 1991 episode of California's Gold with Huell Howser.

See also
 California Fur Rush
 Russian America
 Russian Fort Elizabeth
 Russian-American Company flag

Notes

References

External links 

 Official Fort Ross Conservacy website
 Official California State Parks website
 Withdrawal of Fort Ross Chapel: National Historic Landmarks Program

Ross
Colonial United States (Russian)
Russian-American Company
Ross
Archaeological sites in California
Buildings and structures in Sonoma County, California
Ross
Fur trade
History of Sonoma County, California
Ross
National Historic Landmarks in the San Francisco Bay Area
National Register of Historic Places in Sonoma County, California
Populated places established in 1812
1812 establishments in the Russian Empire
Former Russian colonies
Russian Empire
Military facilities in the San Francisco Bay Area
Military history of California
Russian-American history
Russian-American culture in California
Colonial architecture in California
Articles containing video clips
Populated coastal places in California